Jefferson Elementary School is a historic elementary school building located in South Washington, Washington Township, Daviess County, Indiana.  It was built in 1924, and is a one-story, "I"-shaped, red brick building on a high raised basement with Colonial Revival and Bungalow / American Craftsman style design elements. The building has limestone detailing and a hipped roof topped by a cupola. It has a two-story gymnasium wing.  The school closed in 1976.

It was added to the National Register of Historic Places in 1997.

References

School buildings on the National Register of Historic Places in Indiana
Elementary schools in Indiana
Colonial Revival architecture in Indiana
School buildings completed in 1924
Buildings and structures in Daviess County, Indiana
National Register of Historic Places in Daviess County, Indiana
1924 establishments in Indiana